Massachusetts House of Representatives' 18th Essex district in the United States is one of 160 legislative districts included in the lower house of the Massachusetts General Court. It covers parts of Essex County and Middlesex County. Democrat Tram Nguyen of Andover has represented the district since 2019. She is running for reelection in the 2020 Massachusetts general election.

Towns represented
The district includes the following localities:
 part of Andover
 part of Boxford
 part of North Andover
 part of Tewksbury

The current district geographic boundary overlaps with those of the Massachusetts Senate's 1st Essex and Middlesex and 2nd Essex and Middlesex districts.

Former locales
The district previously covered:
 part of Lynn, circa 1872
 part of Methuen, circa 1974
 Swampscott, circa 1872

Representatives
 Caleb Cushing, circa 1858-1859 
 Elihu B. Hayes, circa 1888 
 James P. Martin, circa 1888 
 George J. Bates, circa 1920 
 Nicholas J. Buglione, circa 1975 
 Barbara L'Italien, January 2003 – January 2011
 James J. Lyons Jr., January 2011 – January 2019 
 Tram Nguyen, 2019-current

See also
 List of Massachusetts House of Representatives elections
 Other Essex County districts of the Massachusetts House of Representatives: 1st, 2nd, 3rd, 4th, 5th, 6th, 7th, 8th, 9th, 10th, 11th, 12th, 13th, 14th, 15th, 16th, 17th
 Essex County districts of the Massachusett Senate: 1st, 2nd, 3rd; 1st Essex and Middlesex; 2nd Essex and Middlesex
 List of Massachusetts General Courts
 List of former districts of the Massachusetts House of Representatives

Images

References

External links
 Ballotpedia
  (State House district information based on U.S. Census Bureau's American Community Survey).
 League of Women Voters of Topsfield-Boxford-Middleton
 League of Women Voters of Andover / North Andover

House
Government of Essex County, Massachusetts
Government of Middlesex County, Massachusetts